The Minister of Labour was the minister in the government responsible for the Department of Labour. The portfolio was established in 1892, a year after the Department of Labour was formed, and was abolished on 1 July 2012, when it was replaced by the Ministry of Business, Innovation and Employment. Today, the duties of the Minister of Labour are assumed by the Minister for Workplace Relations and Safety.

Office-holders
The following MPs have held the office of Minister of Labour:

Key

Notes

References

Labour
Labour